Chaffey College is a public community college in Rancho Cucamonga, California. The college serves students in Chino, Chino Hills, Fontana, Montclair, Ontario, Rancho Cucamonga and Upland. It is the oldest community college in California.

History

The school was established in Ontario, California, in 1883, when city founders and brothers George and William Chaffey donated land and established an endowment for a private college.  The private school was founded as the Chaffey College of Agriculture of the University of Southern California; USC, also a private university, had been founded three years earlier in nearby Los Angeles.  The cornerstone of the new school was laid on March 17, 1883, at Fourth and Euclid in Ontario; it opened on October 15, 1885. The original institution included a secondary school and was run by USC until 1901.  During this period, Chaffey's football team had a 1–1 series with the young USC football team, winning 32–6 in 1893 and losing 38–0 in 1897.

Financial troubles forced the school to close in 1901.  The building was taken over by the city and became the home of Ontario High School (now Chaffey High School).  In 1906 the Chaffey endowment was legally separated from USC and reorganized to benefit the newly created Chaffey Union High School District.  When Ontario High school opened to students from Upland in 1911, its present name was adopted.  In 1916, the Chaffey Junior College of Agriculture was added as a postgraduate department to the high school.  The school's buildings were renovated and additional buildings added during the New Deal.

A separate junior college district was created in 1922 and in 1957 bonds were approved in support of a complete separation of the high school and college facilities.  The current location in Rancho Cucamonga opened in the spring of 1960.  The college's mascot is the Panther.

The Measure L bond provides up to $230 million in bonds during a 10-year period for the Facilities Master Plan. Off-site campuses in Fontana and Chino are also part of this master plan, with a new Fontana campus and Chino campus. The college remains open while undergoing construction, except for occasional diversions in traffic and parking.

Academics  
Chaffey offers associate degrees and occupational certificates. Chaffey offers one of the oldest aviation programs in the United States.

Sports 
The college athletic teams are nicknamed the Panthers.

Notable people

Gloria Negrete McLeod, former United States Representative
Hobart Alter, pioneer in surfboard shaping industry, creator of Hobie Cat and founder of the Hobie Company
Ken Calvert, Member of United States Congress, 41st District (Corona) 
Beverly Cleary, author and recipient of 1984 Newbery Medal
Stewart Donaldson, author, positive psychologist, evaluation scientist
Skip Ewing, country music star
Rollie Fingers, Major League Baseball pitcher, (Hall of Fame)
Darryl Kile, Major League Baseball pitcher (St. Louis Cardinals)
Terry Kirkman, The Association Sixties band, founding member
John Machado, art entrepreneur and historian
Robert Lyn Nelson, marine painter
Peter Popoff, evangelist
Meagan Tandy, Miss California USA 2007
Joseph Wambaugh, author of novels often involving Los Angeles Police Department
Frank Zappa (one semester), musician

References

External links

 

 
California Community Colleges
Education in Rancho Cucamonga, California
Educational institutions established in 1883
Schools accredited by the Western Association of Schools and Colleges
Universities and colleges in San Bernardino County, California
1883 establishments in California